Constantijn Theodoor, Count van Lynden van Sandenburg, (24 February 1826 – 18 November 1885) was a Dutch politician. Van Lynden van Sandenburg served as Chairman of the Council of Ministers (prime minister) of the Netherlands between 1879 and 1883.

History
Lynden van Sandenburg was born in Utrecht in 1826. He trained as a lawyer before entering politics. An orthodox conservative Protestant, Lynden van Sandenburg sided with the anti-revolutionaries. In 1866 he served in the Dutch House of Representatives. He went on to take the position of Minister of Justice between 1874 and 1877 in the Heemskerk/Van Lynden van Sandenburg cabinet.

Lynden van Sandenburg took office as leading minister on 20 August 1879 with his own cabinet. This cabinet was known for its liberal conservatism.

As a member of the ancient Dutch noble Lynden family, Lynden van Sandenburg was born a "baron", but elevated to "count" in 1882, with the right of succession to this title for all his legitimate, male-line descendants. He died in Langbroek in 1885.

References

Notes

Literature
 'Van Lynden', Nederlands Adelsboek 87 (1998), 547–649, there 567.

External links

1826 births
1885 deaths
Prime Ministers of the Netherlands
Ministers of Finance of the Netherlands
Counts of the Netherlands
19th-century Dutch lawyers
Dutch members of the Dutch Reformed Church
Ministers of Justice of the Netherlands
Ministers of Foreign Affairs of the Netherlands
Members of the Senate (Netherlands)
Members of the House of Representatives (Netherlands)
Independent politicians in the Netherlands
Politicians from Utrecht (city)
Utrecht University alumni
Theo